Neketh Gedara Roshan Prabath Jayasuriya, commonly known as Prabath Jayasuriya (born 5 November 1991), is a professional Sri Lankan cricketer who plays for the national team. In domestic matches, he plays for Colts Cricket Club and Jaffna Stallions.

Education
Jayasuriya is a past pupil of Christ Church College, Matale and Lumbini College, Colombo.

Domestic career
He went onto represent Christ Church College U-13 and U-15 teams as well as Matale District XI U-15 team at the 2006 SLC Inter District Tournament. He was later chosen by the Matale Cricket Club to play in the 2007 Sara Division 1 Tournament.

He made his List A debut on 6 December 2011 for Colombo Cricket Club against Sri Lanka Army during the 2011/12 Premier Limited Over Tournament. He made his first-class debut playing for Colombo Cricket Club against Kurunegala Youth Cricket Club on 10 February 2012 during the 2011/12 Premier League Tournament Tier B. He made his T20 debut playing for Colombo Cricket Club against the Lankan Cricket Club on 26 March 2012 during the 2011/12 CSN Premier Clubs T20 Tournament.

In March 2018, he was named in Kandy's squad for the 2017–18 Super Four Provincial Tournament. The following month, he was also named in Kandy's squad for the 2018 Super Provincial One Day Tournament.

In August 2018, he was named in Galle's squad the 2018 SLC T20 League. In March 2019, he was named in Dambulla's squad for the 2019 Super Provincial One Day Tournament. In October 2020, he was drafted by the Jaffna Stallions for the inaugural edition of the Lanka Premier League.

In March 2021, he was part of the Sinhalese Sports Club team that won the 2020–21 SLC Twenty20 Tournament, the first time they had won the tournament since 2005. In August 2021, he was named in the SLC Greys team for the 2021 SLC Invitational T20 League tournament.

International career
In July 2018, he was named in Sri Lanka's One Day International (ODI) squad for their series against South Africa. He made his ODI debut for Sri Lanka against South Africa on 1 August 2018.

He was on the verge of making his test debut during the home test series against Bangladesh way back in April 2021 as an injury replacement to Lasith Embuldeniya but he was not included in the squad for failing skinfold fitness tests and Praveen Jayawickrama who had just 10 first-class games experience under his belt got the nod over the experienced premiere spinner at domestic level. The reason for his exclusion was initially reported by media that Jayasiriya had failed to complete the mandatory two kilometer fitness run inside eight minutes which was in force during the tenure of Mickey Arthur as head coach but the reports were rubbished by SLC as it clarified that Jayasuriya was snubbed based on his skinfold tests. Following Jayawickrama's incredible start to test cricket with twin fifers on debut against Bangladesh, the hopes of Jayasuriya making a case for himself at test level started to wane and Jayasuriya fell under the radar. Despite being a consistent performer at first-class level, Jayasuriya was made to wait for too longer.

In July 2022, he was added to Sri Lanka's Test squad for the second match against Australia. He was included to the final test at the last minute under most dramatic circumstances as Jayawickrama was diagnosed with COVID-19 after testing positive while lead spinner Lasith Embuldeniya was dropped by selectors due to poor run of form. With the lack of backup frontline spinners, captain Dimuth Karunaratne brought Prabath Jayasuriya in the lineup to face Australia in the decisive test having played alongside him for the same club. He made his Test debut on 8 July 2022, for Sri Lanka against Australia. On his debut, he took a five-wicket haul, with figures of 6/118. In the second innings of the match, he took another five-wicket haul, to finish with the best bowling figures for a Sri Lanka player on debut and fourth best overall, with 12 for 177. He also became the second bowler for Sri Lanka to take two five-wicket hauls on Test debut after Praveen Jayawickrama. He was adjudged man of the match award for his match winning bowling performance. He also ended up as the leading wicket taker of the series with 12 scalps despite missing the first test.

In July 2022, he was called to the Test squad as the premium spinner for the series against Pakistan. During the first test of the series against Pakistan, he picked up his third career five-wicket haul in an innings of a test match to become only the third bowler to grab five wicket hauls in his first three test innings since debut after Tom Richardson and Clarrie Grimmett. With record 21 scalps after just two test appearances, he is only behind Narendra Hirwani and Alec Bedser in picking up most test wickets after their first two test matches. He also became the third Sri Lankan bowler after Muttiah Muralitharan and Rangana Herath to secure three consecutive five wicket hauls in consecutive innings in test cricket.

During the second test of the series against Pakistan, he picked up his fourth career five-wicket haul in an innings of a test match to become the seventh bowler overall to take fifers in first three test match appearances and also to become the fifth bowler to claim four five-wicket hauls in first three test appearances from debut. He was awarded player of the series for his impressive performances with the ball which helped Sri Lanka to level the two match test series 1–1 against Pakistan and he also ended up as the top wicket taker of the series with 17 scalps. He made giant leaps in test cricket after a prolific start to his test career by picking up 29 wickets in his first three test matches and he is only behind Narendra Hirwani and Charles Turner for taking most number of wickets after their first three test matches.

Awards
He was awarded the ICC Men's Player of the Month Award for July 2022.

References

External links
 

1991 births
Living people
Sri Lankan cricketers
Sri Lanka Test cricketers
Sri Lanka One Day International cricketers
Chilaw Marians Cricket Club cricketers
Colts Cricket Club cricketers
Galle Guardians cricketers
Kegalle District cricketers
Sinhalese Sports Club cricketers
Cricketers who have taken five wickets on Test debut
Lumbini College alumni